This is a list of diplomatic missions in the Dominican Republic. There are currently 38 embassies in Santo Domingo.

Diplomatic missions in Santo Domingo

Embassies

Other missions or delegations 
  (Embassy Office)
  (Delegation)
  (Trade Office)

Gallery of embassies

Consular missions

Dajabón 
  (Consulate-General)

Higüey 
  (Consulate-General)

Santa Cruz de Barahona 
  (Consulate-General)

Santiago de los Caballeros 
  (Consulate-General)

Non-resident embassies

  (Caracas)
  (Washington)
  (Mexico City)
  (Havana)
  (Kingston)
  (Washington)
  (Havana)
  (Mexico City)
 (Washington, D.C.)
  (New York City)
  (Havana)
  (Havana)
  (Mexico City)
  (Havana)
  (Mexico City)
  (Mexico City)
  (Havana)
  (Havana)
 (Havana)
  (New York City)
  (Washington)
  (New York City)
  (Washington, D.C.)
 (Havana)
 (Havana)
 (Havana)
  (New York City)
  (Havana)
  (Mexico City)
  (Kingston)
  (Havana)
 (Washington, D.C.)
  (Mexico City)
  (Bogotá)
  (Mexico City)
  (Bogotá)
  (Caracas)
  (Washington, D.C.)
  (Havana)
  (Washington D.C.)
  (Havana)
  (Havana)
  (Havana)
 (Washington, D.C.)
  (Havana)
  (Stockholm)
 (Havana)
 (Washington, D.C.)
 (Ottawa)
 (Washington, D.C.)
 (Washington, D.C.)
  (Kingston)
 (Guatemala City)
 (Washington, D.C.)
  (Havana)
  (Havana)
 (Washington, D.C.)
 (Washington, D.C.)
 (Havana)
 (Havana)
 (Washington, D.C.)
 (Washington, D.C.)

Former Embassies

See also
 Foreign relations of the Dominican Republic

References

Dominican Republic
Diplomatic missions